Entropy is considered to be an extensive property, i.e., that its value depends on the amount of material present. Constantino Tsallis has proposed a nonextensive entropy (Tsallis entropy), which is a generalization of the traditional Boltzmann–Gibbs entropy.

The rationale behind the theory is that Gibbs-Boltzmann entropy leads to systems that have a strong dependence on initial conditions. In reality most materials behave quite independently of initial conditions.

Nonextensive entropy leads to nonextensive statistical mechanics, whose typical functions are power laws, instead of the traditional exponentials.

See also 

 Tsallis entropy

Statistical mechanics
Entropy and information
Thermodynamic entropy
Information theory